Andrey Svirkov (born 1 January 1972) is a Belarusian professional football coach and a former player. He is a younger brother of Yury Svirkov, who is also former professional football goalkeeper. The brothers played alongside each other in a number of teams throughout their careers and also worked together in Spartak Nalchik, until Yury left the team in 2009.

Honours
Belshina Bobruisk
Belarusian Cup winner: 1996–97

External links

References

1972 births
Living people
People from Babruysk
Sportspeople from Mogilev Region
Belarusian footballers
Association football goalkeepers
FC Fandok Bobruisk players
FC Slavia Mozyr players
FC Belshina Bobruisk players
FC Torpedo Minsk players
FC Osipovichi players
FC SKVICH Minsk players
FC Khimik Svetlogorsk players
FC Baranovichi players
FC Dnepr Rogachev players
Belarusian football managers
FC UAS Zhitkovichi managers